The First Battle of Nogales, was a military confrontation between federal Mexican forces and rebel Constitutionalists during the Mexican Revolution.

The battle was fought at the border city of Nogales, Sonora on March 13, 1913. Rebel forces under General Alvaro Obregon attacked the federal garrison of about 400 infantry. Obregon's army included infantry, cavalry and at least one artillery piece. Fighting lasted for a few hours before the federal commander colonel Emilio Kosterlitzky was captured. The remaining federal troops retreated across the border and surrendered to the United States Army garrison of Nogales, Arizona. Captain Cornelius C. Smith relieved the federals of their weapons and they eventually found their way back to Mexico. Six rebels were killed in action and nine were wounded. The federals lost four men killed and five wounded, and Nogales, Sonora fell to the Constitutionalists.

See also

Pancho Villa Expedition

References

Trimble, Marshall, (1998), Arizona, A Cavalcade of History Treasure Chest Publications, Tucson, Arizona 
Cornelius Smith, Emilio Kosterlitzky, Eagle of Sonora (1970)

History of Mexico
History of Arizona
Nogales 1913
Nogales
History of Santa Cruz County, Arizona
1913 in Arizona
March 1913 events in North America